Lucas Dominique Noubi Ngnokam (born 15 January 2005) is a Belgian professional footballer who plays for Standard Liège.

Club career 
Lucas Noubi arrived to the Standard Liège academy in 2015, from Mouscron.

He made his professional debut for Standard Liège on the 13 March 2022, starting the Division 1A derby against RFC Seraing as a centre-back.

International career 
Born in Belgium, Noubi is of Cameroonian descent. He is a youth international for Belgium, playing with the Under-17 and he is the  captain during the 2021–22 season.

References

External links

2005 births
Living people
People from Mouscron
Belgian footballers
Belgium youth international footballers
Belgian people of Cameroonian descent
Association football defenders
Standard Liège players
Belgian Pro League players
Footballers from Hainaut (province)